Atar Arad (Hebrew: עתר ארד; born 8 March 1945) is an Israeli American violist, professor of music, essayist and composer.

Biography
Arad and his brother, architect Ron Arad, were born in Tel Aviv, Israel. Arad began his training on the violin in Tel Aviv and received an Artist Diploma in 1966 from the Samuel Rubin Israeli Academy of Music.  In 1968 he was selected for study at Chapelle Musicale Reine Elisabeth in Waterloo, Belgium, earning a Laureate there in 1971 and a Diplome Superieure from Brussels Conservatory in 1973.

Having decided to devote himself to the viola in 1971, he entered the Carl Flesch International Competition in 1972 as a violist, winning the City of London prize (second prize) in his first public appearance with the instrument.  Two months later he repeated, winning first prize in the International Viola Competition in Geneva, Switzerland.

Arad has performed around the world as a soloist with orchestras and as a member of the Cleveland Quartet from 1980 to 1987, taking the seat previously established by founding member Martha Strongin Katz. He was succeeded by James Dunham.      

Arad teaches at Indiana University's Jacobs School of Music in Bloomington, and the Steans Institute for Young Artists at the Ravinia Festival in Highland Park, Illinois as well as the Domaine Forget Music and Dance Academy in Quebec. Previously he was professor of viola at the Eastman School of Music in Rochester, New York.  He has also taught at the Shepherd School of Music at Rice University in Houston, Texas, and has been an artist/lecturer at Carnegie Mellon University in Pittsburgh, Pennsylvania. Prior to 1980 he served on faculties at Chapelle Musicale Reine Elisabeth and the Royal Northern College of Music, Manchester, England.

Performance venues 
 Berlin Music Festival, Berlin, Germany
 Israel Festival, Caesarea, Israel
 Flanders Music Festival, Antwerp, Belgium
 Edinburgh Festival, Edinburgh, Scotland
 Salzburg Festival, Salzburg, Austria
 Mostly Mozart Festival, New York City, NY, United States
 Sitka Summer Music Festival, Sitka, Alaska, United States
 Aspen Music Festival, Aspen, Colorado, United States
 Chautauqua Festival, Chautauqua, New York, United States
 Ravinia Festival near Chicago, Illinois, United States
 Domaine Forget International Festival, Saint-Irenee, Quebec, Canada
 North Shore Chamber Music Festival, Northbrook, Illinois, United States

Compositions and recordings 

His compositions include:
 Sonata for Viola Solo (1992)
 String Quartet (1993)
 Caprices for Viola Solo (2003)
 Concerto per la Viola (2005)

His essays have explored compositional aspects of viola concertos:
 The Thirteen Pages (The American String Teacher, Winter 1988)
 Walton as Scapino (The Strad, February 1989)

He has recorded, as featured soloist or with the Cleveland Quartet, on the RCA Red Seal, CBS Masterworks, Teldec Telefunken, Telarc and RIAX Records Classical labels.

References 

1945 births
Living people
Israeli Jews
Rice University faculty
Carnegie Mellon University faculty
Israeli classical violists
Jacobs School of Music faculty
People from Tel Aviv
Winners of the Geneva International Music Competition